Golpe Avisa is the sixth studio album from Cartel de Santa. It was released on August 5, 2014 by Sony Music and Babilonia Music. The album has featured guests such as Campa, Millonario, Draw and Big Man.

Track listing 
 Andamos Zumbando
 Si Te Vienen A Contar
 Suena Mamalona (ft. Campa) – contains sample from "Cumbia De Las Estrellas" by Super Grupo Colombia
 Es De Ley (ft. Draw)
 Escucha y Aprende
 Bullyar
 Los Mensajes Del WhatsApp – contains sample from "Groovy Situation" by Keith Rowe
 Doctor Marihuano (ft. Big Man) 
 Me Alegro De Su Odio
 Wacha, Estan Mamando Riata
 A Ti Te Da Besitos – contains sample from "Short Dick Man" by 20 Fingers & Gillette
 Para Cada Loco
 Lo Que Quiero Es Besarte

Certifications

References

2014 albums
Cartel de Santa albums